{{Listen
 |filename     = Lucio Battisti - Anonimo.ogg
 |title        = Anonimo
 |description  = Anonimos ending, with the self-parodistic quotation of I giardini di marzo
| filename2    = Lucio Battisti - Il salame.ogg
| title2       = Il salame
| description2 = Il salame shows the use of advanced recording devices and editing techniques
| filename3    = Lucio Battisti - Macchina del tempo.ogg
| title3       = Macchina del tempo
| description3 = Macchina del tempo, track #10
}}Anima latina''' (Latin soul) is an album by the Italian singer-songwriter Lucio Battisti. It was released in December 1974 by Numero Uno. The album was arranged and produced by the lyricist Mogol and Battisti in its entirety, with performances by various semi-unknown musicians. It is considered one of Battisti's masterpieces for signaling a significant departure from his previous records. Anima latina was Italy's eighth best-selling album of 1975.

The albumAnima latina was meant by Battisti as an experiment, "the exact point of rupture between [his] yesterday and [his] tomorrow". The album was conceived after a trip which Battisti took to South America and is particularly influenced by Brazilian music.

 Track listing 
All lyrics written by Mogol, all music composed by Battisti.
 "Abbracciala abbracciali abbracciati" (Embrace Her, Embrace Them, Embrace Yourself) – 7:04
 "Due mondi" (Two Worlds) – 5:13
 "Anonimo" (Anonymous) – 7:03
 "Gli uomini celesti" (The Celestial Men) – 5:06
 "Gli uomini celesti (ripresa)" (The Celestial Men (reprise)) – 0:52
 "Due mondi (ripresa)" (Two Worlds (reprise)) – 1:10
 "Anima latina" (Latin Soul) – 6:37
 "Il salame" (The Salami) – 3:38
 "La nuova America" (The New America) – 2:49
 "Macchina del tempo" (Time Machine) – 6:59
 "Separazione naturale" (Natural Separation'') – 1:28

Personnel
 Alberto Radius - backing vocals
 Gianni Bogliano - trombone
 Lucio Battisti - arranger, theorbo, composer, guitar, keyboards, piano, primary artist, vocals
 Fabio Berruti - artwork, graphic design
 Piero Bravin - sound technician
 Pippo Colucci - trumpet
 Mara Cubbedu - vocals (on "Due mondi"), backing vocals
 Gianni Dall'Aglio - drums
 La Rosa, Antonio - remastering
 Massimo Luca - guitar
 Claudio Maioli - keyboards
 Mogol - composer
 Caesar Monti - photography
 Gigi Mucciolo - trumpet
 Dodo Nileb (Franco Loprevite) - percussion
 Claudio Pascoli - drums, flute
 Gneo Pompeo - strings, synthesizer
 Bob Wayne (Bob Callero) - bass, basso continuo

The name "Gneo Pompeo" (Italian for Gnaeus Pompeius) is a pseudonym and is widely believed to stand for Gian Piero Reverberi. It has also been claimed that it stands for Gabriele Lorenzi.

References

External links
 Lucio Battisti, Anima Latina at www.allmusic.com

1974 albums
Progressive rock albums by Italian artists
Lucio Battisti albums